Ismail Shah may refer to:

 Ismail Shah (footballer) (born 1971), Maldivian footballer
 Ismail Adil Shah (1498–1534), king of Bijapur